Lundgren is a Swedish surname. Notable people with the surname include:

Anders Lundgren (1898–1964) — sailor: gold, 1924 Summer Olympics
Bo Lundgren (b. 1947) — Swedish politician: former head of the Moderate Party
Carl Lundgren (1880–1934) — Illinois baseball player: Chicago Cubs
Carl Lundgren (illustrator) (b. 1947) — American illustrator
Carl A. Lundgren — subject of Ex parte Lundgren
Charles Lundgren, American curler
Del Lundgren (Ebin Delmer Lundgren, 1899–1984) – American baseball player
Dolph Lundgren (b. 1957) — action film actor: Rocky IV, Masters of the Universe, Universal Soldier
Emanuel Lundgren — leader of Swedish band I'm from Barcelona
Eva Lundgren (b. 1947); Norwegian-Swedish feminist scholar
Eva-Lena Lundgren (born circa 1961) — beauty pageant contestant: Miss Sweden 1981
Fredrik Lundgren (b. 1979) — Swedish soccer player
Gillis Lundgren
Gunilla Lundgren (b. 1942) — Swedish environmental activist
Jan Lundgren (b. 1966) — Swedish jazz pianist
Jeffrey Lundgren (1950–2006) — cult leader; murderer
Kent T. Lundgren (1914–1986), American pharmacist and politician
Kerstin Lundgren (b. 1955) — Swedish politician, Centre Party
Nils Lundgren (b. 1937) — Swedish economist and politician: Member of the European Parliament
Ockelbo-Lundgren (Erik Lundgren) — Swedish kit car builder
 P.A. Lundgren (1911–2002) — Swedish art director
Peter Lundgren (b. 1965) — Swedish tennis player
Sofia Lundgren (b. 1982) — Swedish soccer player:: goalkeeper, Swedish national team
Sven Lundgren (1896–1960) — Swedish runner: bronze, 1920 Summer Olympics
Terry J. Lundgren (b. 1952) — American business executive: CEO, Neiman Marcus and Macy's
Wayne Lundgren (b. 1982) — Australian baseball player
Ester Ringnér-Lundgren (1907–1993) — Swedish children's book writer

Fictional characters
Brooke Lundgren — a character in the Grey Griffins book series

See also
Ex parte Lundgren (2003) — a U.S. patent law case concerning the patentability of business processes
Lundgren guitar pickups
Lundgren and Maurer — a mid-20th century Texas architecture firm
 Dan Lungren (b. 1946) — American politician: U.S. Congressman from California; California Attorney General

Swedish-language surnames